Timber Lake is a lake in Jackson County, in the U.S. state of Minnesota.

Timber Lake was named for the trees beside the lake on an otherwise relatively barren landscape.

See also
List of lakes in Minnesota

References

Lakes of Minnesota
Lakes of Jackson County, Minnesota